Blocking may refer to:

Science, technology, and mathematics

Computing and telecommunications
Blacklist (computing)
Blocking (computing), holding up a task until an event occurs
Blocking (radio), interference by an off-frequency signal
Blocking probability, for calls in a telecommunications system
Head-of-line blocking, in some network switching fabrics
Internet blocking; see Block (Internet)

Psychology
Thought blocking, a type of thought disorder
Blocking effect, in psychology
Mental block, a type of suppression or repression

Other uses in science
Blocking (linguistics), where the existence of a competing form blocks the application of a morphological process
Blocking (statistics), in the design of experiments, the arranging of experimental units in groups (blocks) which are similar to one another
Atmospheric blocking, a phenomenon in meteorology of large scale stationary pressure cells
Blocking, in the western blot technique, a process to prevent unwanted binding of antibodies to a membrane

Other technologies
Blocking (construction), short boards used as reinforcement or to provide attachment points in wood-framed and other forms of construction

Sport
Blocking (American football), the legal interference with another player's motion
Blocking (martial arts), a defensive technique in martial arts

Theatre and film
Blocking (stage), the movement and positioning of actors on a stage, or within a frame in film
Blocking (animation), a technique in which key poses establish timing and placement of items in a scene

Other uses
Blocking (textile arts), the process of stretching a knitted garment into shape while wet or using steam
Blocking (transport), the process of dividing a transit schedule into parts that can be operated by a single vehicle
Blocking troops - military barrier troops positioned to forestall unauthorised retreats

See also
Block (disambiguation)
Non-blocking (disambiguation)